Devitt Whitton 'Dev' Dines (1931–2018) was an Australian rugby league footballer who played in the 1950s.

Playing career
Dines was a five-eighth for Western Suburbs between 1950-1951, late 1952, 1953-1957. He had transferred to Mareeba, Queensland as a player in 1952 before being sensationally recalled to Western Suburbs, in a bid to help the club win the 1952 Grand Final as two of their best players, Keith Holman and Frank Stanmore were away on the 1952/53 Kangaroo tour. 

Dines scored a try in the 1952 Grand Final side that won the premiership. Dines stayed with Western Suburbs for a few more years before retiring. In total, Dines made 58 appearances for Wests.

Dines was a co-founder and Life Member of the Canley Vale Junior Rugby League Football Club.
He died in Tamworth, New South Wales on 2 March 2018 aged 90.

References

Western Suburbs Magpies players
Australian rugby league players
Rugby league five-eighths
2018 deaths
1931 births